Isia is a genus of moths in the subfamily Arctiinae erected by Francis Walker in 1856.

Species
 Isia alcumena Berg, 1882
 Isia cornuta Travassos, 1947
 Isia intricata Walker, 1856

References

Arctiinae
Moth genera